New York Cares is a nonprofit organization focused on volunteer management and was founded by a group of New York residents in 1987 who wanted to take action against social issues in New York City. The organization currently engages 65,000 volunteers in service each year. The organization works with about 1,300 nonprofits and schools, and aims to improve education, meet immediate needs, and revitalize public spaces throughout NYC. The organization plans and manages about 1,600 volunteer projects each month.

New York Cares is a member of the Hands On Network and the Points of Light Foundation.

Signature programs
The New York Cares Coat Drive is a popular holiday philanthropic tradition due to the highly-recognizable 'Shivering Statue of Liberty' image employed in its marketing materials. It has collected and distributed over 1.7 million coats to people in need since 1989.

New York Cares Day is the organization's largest volunteer day where volunteers revitalize NYC public schools and raise money for New York Cares' education programs.

The organization's Winter Wishes program provides holiday gifts to over 42,000 New Yorkers in need each year who might otherwise receive little or nothing for the holidays. Kids and teens write letters to New York Cares, which then gives the letters to individuals who buy gifts for those who requested them.

In popular culture
The organization is referenced in the chorus of the song "NYC" by the American rock band Interpol.

References

External links
 newyorkcares.org
 handsonnetwork.org
 pointsoflight.org

HIV/AIDS activism
Organizations based in New York City
Volunteer organizations